Aesopida is a genus of longhorn beetles of the subfamily Lamiinae, containing the following species:

 Aesopida malasiaca J. Thomson, 1864
 Aesopida sericea Breuning, 1950

References

Mesosini
Cerambycidae genera